Robert Mitcheson (1901–1938) was an English footballer who played as an outside forward in the Football League for Darlington and in non-league football for Leadgate Park.

Life and career
Mitcheson was born and raised in Blackhill, County Durham, and was three months old at the time of the 1901 Census. He was the son of Robert B. Mitcheson, who worked as a labourer at a steelworks gas producer, and his wife Mary Jane.

Mitcheson was a member of the Leadgate Park team that beat Hartlepools United 2–1 after extra time to win the 1921 Durham Senior Cup. Described as "a much sought outside right", he joined Third Division North runners-up Darlington ahead of the 1922–23 Football League season, but played infrequently for the first team, and sometimes at outside left. At the end of the season, during which he made only six league appearances, he and teammate Ernie Young moved to Leadgate Park of the North-Eastern League.

He died in 1938 at the age of 37, and was buried at Blackhill Cemetery, Consett, on 4 April 1938.

Notes

References

1901 births
1938 deaths
Sportspeople from Consett
Footballers from County Durham
English footballers
Association football wingers
Leadgate Park F.C. players
Darlington F.C. players
English Football League players